Day of the Dead is the fourth studio album by American rap rock band Hollywood Undead. Originally set to be released October 2014, Day of the Dead was released March 31, 2015, on Interscope Records.

Release and promotion
To promote the new album, the band embarked on the Album Release tour, beginning March 9, 2014 in Philadelphia, Pennsylvania, and ending on March 30 in Los Angeles, California. Fans that purchased tickets received access to a digital download of the album (including every single released before the album's arrival). Prior to the release of the first single, it was hyped up through social media websites such as Facebook, Instagram, and Twitter. On October 21, 2014, the first single from the album, "Day of the Dead", was released through Revolver Magazine. The name of the album was also revealed, being the same as the single.

It was announced that the album would be available for preorder on February 17, along with the release of the second song from the album, "Usual Suspects".

The single called "Gravity" was released on February 23.
Leading up to the new CD's release, the band would unveil five new tracks from the album every Tuesday, which began with "Usual Suspects" on February 17. March 3 being an exception, where instead the band was to release the music video for "Day of the Dead". However, it was delayed to March 17, 2015 and several song samples were released March 7.

"How We Roll" was released as a single on March 9, a day earlier to make up for the delayed release of the "Day of the Dead" music video which was released on March 16. After "How We Roll", their songs were released on Mondays "Live Forever" on March 17, and "Disease" was released as a single on March 23. "War Child" was released on March 27.

The band released songs every week beginning with "Usual Suspects". Additionally, they put a band member's new mask on the artwork for each single with Johnny 3 Tears on "Usual Suspects", Danny on "Gravity", J-Dog on "How We Roll", Funny Man on "Live Forever" and Da Kurlzz on "Disease".

The band also undertook an album release tour throughout the month of March in the US, culminating back home in Los Angeles on March 31.

After the release of their fourth and new album, Day of the Dead, J-Dog, Charlie Scene, and Johnny 3 Tears spoke about their inspiration and stories on how they began work for the new album. In an interview J-Dog shared the story behind their new track "Usual Suspects" on how they began to drink in the recording studio. They eventually go down to a 7-Eleven near the studio to buy big gulp cups of ice filled with orange juice and champagne. By this point they were completely intoxicated as they walked down Sunset Blvd practically drinking mimosas. The band started writing lyrics about the Sunset Strip when suddenly Johnny 3 Tears started talking weird about losing his mind, the band quickly began writing lyrics on it. At the end, the band felt that the song came out feel like an old school Hollywood Undead song. The inspiration for the song title came from the famous phrase line, "Round up the usual suspects", from the classic 1942 film Casablanca. J-Dog also addressed critics saying that they are still the same band since they started back in 2005 and in no way have changed.

Track listing

Personnel 
Credits adapted from AllMusic.

Hollywood Undead
 Jorel "J-Dog" Decker – vocals, rhythm guitar, bass, keyboards, synth, programming, production
 Matthew "Da Kurlzz" Busek – vocals on "Gravity" and "Ghost", drums, percussion, backing vocals
 Dylan "Funny Man" Alvarez  – vocals, soundboards
 George "Johnny 3 Tears" Ragan – vocals, bass
 Jordon "Charlie Scene" Terrell – vocals, lead guitar, production
 Daniel "Danny" Murillo – vocals, keyboards, rhythm guitar, bass

Production
 Griffin Boice – production
 Sean Gould – production
 Ted Jensen – mastering, at Sterling Sound, NYC

Charts

Weekly charts

Year-end charts

References

2015 albums
Hollywood Undead albums
Interscope Records albums
Interscope Geffen A&M Records albums